The Atlantic bamboo rat (Kannabateomys amblyonyx), or southern bamboo rat, is a spiny rat species found in humid tropical forests in Argentina, Brazil and Paraguay.  It is the only member of the genus Kannabateomys.

Description
The pelage is the typical agouti brown-to-grey colour of many rodents, grading to chestnut on the flanks. The chin and underparts are white tinged with reddish brown. The first  of the tail are well-haired but the rest is sparsely haired. There is a distinct tuft of hairs at the tip. When fully grown, this bamboo rat with its long tail is unlikely to be mistaken for any other species.

Etymology

Distribution and habitat
This species is native to South America, where its range includes southeastern Brazil, eastern Paraguay and northeastern Argentina. Typical habitat is moist forests near water with dense understorey of bamboos. It is particularly associated with the giant bamboo Guadua angustifolia, which forms thickets.

Ecology
The Atlantic bamboo rat is nocturnal and is highly arboreal, scrambling around in trees and bamboos, especially near water. When alarmed it issues loud squeals. It probably feeds on grasses, leaves, shoots, fruits and tubers.

Phylogeny
Kannabateomys is a member of the Echimyini clade of arboreal Echimyidae rodents. Its closest relatives are Dactylomys and Olallamys. These South American bamboo rats share unique features and are grouped under the informal clade name of "Dactylomyines". The dactylomyines are the sister genera to Diplomys and Santamartamys. All these taxa are closely related to the genera Echimys, Phyllomys, Makalata, Pattonomys, and Toromys. In turn, these genera share phylogenetic affinities with the clade containing Lonchothrix and Mesomys, and with Isothrix.

Status
K. amblyonyx is not a common species. In the state of Rio Grande do Sul in Brazil, for example, it has been recorded as having a density of just over four individuals per square kilometre. As a nocturnal animal it is seldom seen, but it has an extensive range and is presumed to have a large total population. In some places, such as in the state of Minas Gerais in Brazil, it is threatened locally by forest clearance, but other specific threats have not been identified and the International Union for Conservation of Nature has rated its conservation status as "least concern".

References

Echimyidae
Mammals described in 1845